Mamadi Caba Camará (born 31 December 2003) is a Bissau-Guinean professional footballer who plays as an attacking midfielder and winger for  club Reading and the Guinea-Bissau.

Career
After playing youth football for  C.D. Feirense, he joined Reading in 2020. He made his debut as a substitute in a 1–0 FA Cup defeat away to Luton Town on 9 January 2021. On 3 February 2021, Camará signed his first professional contract with Reading, until the summer of 2022.

International career
Camará received his first call-up for Guinea-Bissau national football team for the friendlies against Angola and Equatorial Guinea on 23 and 26 March 2022. Camará made his debut for Guinea-Bissau on 23 March 2022 against Equatorial Guinea with a man-of-the-match performance.

Career statistics

International

References

2003 births
Living people
Bissau-Guinean footballers
Guinea-Bissau international footballers
Association football forwards
C.D. Feirense players
Reading F.C. players
Bissau-Guinean expatriate footballers
Bissau-Guinean expatriate sportspeople in England
Bissau-Guinean expatriate sportspeople in Portugal
Expatriate footballers in England
English Football League players